Chardon may refer to:

Places
Chardon, Kansas
Chardon, Ohio
Chardon Township, Geauga County, Ohio

People
Carlos E. Chardón (born 1897), Puerto Rican mycologist and Chancellor of the University of Puerto Rico
Carlos Fernando Chardón (born 1907), former Secretary of State of Puerto Rico and Puerto Rico Adjuntant General
Carlos A. Chardón López (born 1939), former Secretary (Commissioner) of Education of the Puerto Rico Department of Education
Jean-Baptiste Chardon, a French Jesuit missionary in New France

Other
 The Chardon Polka Band, a polka band from Chardon, Ohio

See also
 Chadron (disambiguation)